Dennis O'Neill may refer to:

Dennis O'Neill (baseball) (1866–1912), 19th-century baseball player
Dennis O'Neill (manslaughter victim), British manslaughter victim
Dennis O'Neill (rugby league), rugby league footballer of the 1970s for Great Britain, and Widnes
Dennis O'Neill (tenor) (born 1948), Welsh tenor

See also 
Dennis O'Neil (born 1939; died 2020) aka Denny O'Neill, American comic book writer and editor
Dennis Patrick O'Neil, Roman Catholic bishop